Ilocano or Ilokano may refer to:
 Ilocano people
 Ilocano language
 Ilocano literature

Language and nationality disambiguation pages